Mille Lacs County is a county in the East Central part of the U.S. state of Minnesota. As of the 2020 census, the population was 26,459. Its county seat is Milaca. The county was founded in 1857, and its boundary was expanded in 1860.

Mille Lacs County is included in the Minneapolis-St. Paul Metropolitan Statistical Area.

A portion of the Mille Lacs Indian Reservation is in the county.

Etymology
The name Mille Lacs, meaning "thousand lakes" in French, was associated with Mille Lacs Lake in the region. (Its full name in French was Grand lac du pays des mille lacs.) This is the largest lake in the Brainerd Lakes Area, which French colonists and traders called the "Region of the Thousand Lakes" (Pays des mille lacs).

History
The US legislature established the Wisconsin Territory effective July 3, 1836. It existed until its eastern portion was granted statehood (as Wisconsin) in 1848. The federal government set up the Minnesota Territory from the remaining territory effective March 3, 1849. The newly organized territorial legislature created nine counties across the territory in October of that year. On May 23, 1857, one of those original counties, Benton, had its eastern portion partitioned off to create Mille Lacs County. The original county consisted of the portion of the contemporary Mille Lacs County east of the west branch of the Rum River and two townships now part of Isanti County, adjacent to Mille Lacs County. In 1858 the 12 townships forming the contemporary southern 10 townships of Mille Lacs County and the two northwestern townships in Isanti County were organized apart from Benton and Mille Lacs Counties to form Monroe County, leaving the northern "Square Top-knot" as Mille Lacs County. In 1860, Monroe and Mille Lacs Counties merged. Shortly thereafter, the two southeastern townships were transferred to Isanti County, forming the county's present boundaries.

Geography
The Rum River flows south through the county, originating from Mille Lacs Lake. It is joined by the West Branch of the Rum River, which rises in northwest Mille Lacs County and flows south-southeast to its confluence with the Rum at Princeton. The county terrain consists of wooded rolling hills, carved by drainages, with open areas devoted to agriculture. The terrain slopes to the south and east, with its highest point at one mile (1.6 km) from the southwest shoreline of Mille Lacs Lake, in Mille Lacs Kathio State Park. A hill there measures 1,371' (418m) ASL.

Major highways

  U.S. Highway 169
  Minnesota State Highway 18
  Minnesota State Highway 23
  Minnesota State Highway 27
  Minnesota State Highway 47
  Minnesota State Highway 95

Airports
 Milaca Municipal Airport (18Y) - northeast of Milaca
 Princeton Municipal Airport (PNM) - southwest of Princeton

Adjacent counties

 Aitkin County - north
 Kanabec County - northeast
 Isanti County - southeast
 Sherburne County - south
 Benton County - southwest
 Morrison County - west
 Crow Wing County - northwest

Protected areas

 Father Hennepin State Park
 Four Brooks State Wildlife Management Area (part)
 Kunkel State Wildlife Management Area
 Mille Lacs Kathio State Park
 Mille Lacs National Wildlife Refuge
 Mille Lacs State Wildlife Management Area
 Rum River State Forest
 Solana State Forest (part)

Demographics

2000 census

As of the 2000 census, there were 22,330 people, 8,638 households, and 6,003 families in the county. The population density was 39.0/sqmi (15.1/km2). There were 10,467 housing units at an average density of 18.3/sqmi (7.07/km2). The racial makeup of the county was 93.55% White, 0.27% Black or African American, 4.68% Native American, 0.21% Asian, 0.01% Pacific Islander, 0.22% from other races, and 1.05% from two or more races. 0.96% of the population were Hispanic or Latino of any race. 31.9% were of German, 14.4% Swedish and 14.2% Norwegian ancestry.

There were 8,638 households, out of which 32.20% had children under the age of 18 living with them, 55.50% were married couples living together, 9.50% had a female householder with no husband present, and 30.50% were non-families. 25.90% of all households were made up of individuals, and 12.00% had someone living alone who was 65 years of age or older. The average household size was 2.53 and the average family size was 3.03.

The county population contained 27.00% under the age of 18, 7.50% from 18 to 24, 26.90% from 25 to 44, 22.60% from 45 to 64, and 16.10% who were 65 years of age or older. The median age was 38 years. For every 100 females there were 98.00 males. For every 100 females age 18 and over, there were 96.10 males.

The median income for a household in the county was $36,977, and the median income for a family was $44,054. Males had a median income of $32,348 versus $22,036 for females. The per capita income for the county was $17,656. About 6.70% of families and 9.60% of the population were below the poverty line, including 10.90% of those under age 18 and 11.30% of those age 65 or over.

2020 Census

Communities

Cities

 Bock
 Foreston
 Isle (Chi-minising)
 Milaca (county seat)
 Onamia
 Pease
 Princeton (partly in Sherburne County)
 Wahkon

Census-designated place
 Vineland (Neyaashiing)

Unincorporated communities

 Bayview
 Cove
 Estes Brook
 Long Siding
 Opstead
 Page
 Woodward Brook

Ghost towns

 Brickton
 Burnhelm Siding
 Esteville
 Freer
 Johnsdale
 Soule's Crossing
 Stirling

Townships

 Bogus Brook Township
 Borgholm Township
 Bradbury Township
 Dailey Township
 East Side Township
 Greenbush Township
 Hayland Township
 Isle Harbor Township
 Kathio Township
 Lewis Township
 Milaca Township
 Milo Township
 Mudgett Township
 Onamia Township
 Page Township
 Princeton Township
 South Harbor Township

Politics
Mille Lacs County voters have traditionally voted a balanced ticket, but in the past few decades have become strongly Republican. Since 1980 the county selected the Republican Party candidate in 67% of national elections (as of 2020).

See also
 National Register of Historic Places listings in Mille Lacs County, Minnesota

References

External links
 Mille Lacs County government’s website
 Minnesota Department of Transportation map of Mille Lacs County

 
Minnesota counties
1857 establishments in Minnesota Territory
Populated places established in 1857